Chaiyapruk Didyasarin (born 8 December 1958) is a former Thai air force officer. He served as commander-in-chief of the Royal Thai Air Force from 1 October 2018 to 30 September 2019. Manat Wongwat was appointed as his successor.  he serves as chairman of the board of directors of Thai Airways.

In August 2019, he received Singapore's Meritorious Service Medal (Military) award.

References 

Living people
1958 births
Place of birth missing (living people)
Chaiyapruk Didyasarin
Chaiyapruk Didyasarin
Chaiyapruk Didyasarin
Chaiyapruk Didyasarin